Bruja is the fifth studio album by Spanish hip hop singer La Mala Rodriguez. It was released on June 18, 2013.  On this album Rodriquez presents a combination of flamenco and rap.

Bruja was named "Best Urban Music Album" at the 2013 Latino Grammy Awards in Las Vegas. This was Rodriguez' second Latino Grammy.

Track listing 

  Esclavos                             3:43
  Caja de Madera                       2:54
  33                                   2:29
  Cuando Tu Me Apagas                  3:10
  Caliente (feat. Sefyu)               4:46
  Hazme Eso                            3:19
  Lluvia                               3:21
  Dorothy                              3:33
  La Rata                              2:08
  Quién Manda                         2:47
  Miedo a Volar                       3:31 
  Ella (feat. Canserbero)             3:59
  Quién Manda (feat. Rapsusklei)      3:31

References

External links
Grammy winners

2013 albums
Mala Rodríguez albums
Latin Grammy Award for Best Urban Music Album